Demand is the desire to own something and the ability to pay for it.

Demand may also refer to:

Economics 
Demand schedule, a table that lists the quantity of a good a person will buy it each different price
Demand curve, a graphical representation of a demand schedule 
Demand pull theory, the theory that inflation occurs when demand for goods and services exceeds existing supplies
Demand-side economics, the school of economics that believes government spending and tax cuts strengthen the economy by raising demand
Demand deposit, the money in checking accounts

Other uses
Demand Media, an  online media company
Demand (electrical engineering) the amount of electrical power being withdrawn from an electrical grid

See also